The BPS Barbara Wilson Lifetime Achievement Award is the highest UK professional award for clinical neuropsychologists.

It was created by the British Psychological Society's Division of Neuropsychology (DoN) in 2010 and is awarded on an annual basis. The award is named in honour of Professor Barbara A. Wilson, OBE, Ph.D, CPsychol, ScD, FBPsS, FMedSci, AcSS. Professor Wilson is one of the world's most eminent clinical neuropsychologists in medical neurorehabilitation. Nominations are invited from DoN members and are considered by an independent awards panel.

The award is made for an outstanding contribution to neuropsychology in the UK. The contribution may be in relation to research, training or clinical service development, with a significant impact on the practice of clinical neuropsychology either nationally or internationally. The award is normally made to someone in the middle or later stage of their career as a clinical neuropsychologist. Winners are announced at the DoN Annual Conference.

Winners

See also

List of psychology awards

References

British awards
Neuropsychologists
British Psychological Society
Psychology awards
Lifetime achievement awards